The United Nations Educational, Scientific and Cultural Organization (UNESCO) World Heritage Sites are places of importance to cultural or natural heritage as described in the UNESCO World Heritage Convention, established in 1972. Croatia, following its declaration of independence from Yugoslavia on 25 June 1991, succeeded the convention on 6 July 1992.

Currently, there are ten sites inscribed on the list and 15 sites on the tentative list. The first three sites, Historical Complex of Split with the Palace of Diocletian, Dubrovnik, and Plitvice Lakes National Park, were inscribed to the list at the 3rd UNESCO session in 1979. Further sites were added in 1997, 2000, 2008, 2016, and 2017. In total, there are eight cultural and two natural sites, as determined by the organization's selection criteria. Three of the sites are shared with other countries.

During the Croatian War of Independence, following the breakup of Yugoslavia, military confrontations took place in Dubrovnik (Siege of Dubrovnik) and in the Plitvice Lakes area. Extensive artillery damage in Dubrovnik and landmines laid around Plitvice resulted in the two sites being listed as endangered in 1991. Following their restoration, Plitvice and Dubrovnik were removed from the list of endangered sites in 1997 and 1998, respectively. Although Croatia's World Heritage Sites generate large numbers of visitors, new threats are emerging due to the detrimental effects of uncontrolled mass tourism.

World Heritage Sites
UNESCO lists sites under ten criteria; each entry must meet at least one of the criteria. Criteria i through vi are cultural, and vii through x are natural.

Tentative list
In addition to the sites inscribed on the World Heritage list, member states can maintain a list of tentative sites that they may consider for nomination. Nominations for the World Heritage list are only accepted if the site was previously listed on the tentative list. As of 2021, Croatia recorded fifteen sites on its tentative list.

See also
List of protected areas of Croatia
Register of Protected Natural Values of Croatia
Register of Cultural Goods of Croatia
UNESCO Intangible Cultural Heritage Lists

References

External links
World Heritage List

 

 
World Heritage Sites
Croatia
World Heritage Sites
World Heritage Sites